The structure of the Israel Defense Forces (IDF) differs from most armed forces in the world in several ways. These include the close integration of air, ground, and sea forces, and the conscription of women. Since its founding, the IDF has adapted to match Israel's unique security situation. The IDF is one of Israeli society's most prominent institutions, influencing the country's economy, culture and political scene. Following 1967, the Israel Army has had close military relations with the United States Army, including development and cooperation, such as on the F-15 jet, and the Arrow missile defense system.

Armed Forces

Air Force

Israeli Air Force
Israeli Air Defense Command
Shaldag Unit

Ground Forces
GOC Army Headquarters
Israeli Ground Forces
Armored Corps (Israel)
Artillery Corps (Israel)
Combat Engineering Corps
Infantry Corps (Israel)
Combat Intelligence Corps

Naval Force

Israeli Naval Academy
Israeli Navy
Shayetet 13

C4I Corps

Technological and Logistics

Military Intelligence

Police Force

Israel Police
Israel Border Police
Israel Prison Service
Ministry of Public Security (Israel)
Yamas (Israel Border Police unit)

Military Industries

Aeronautics Defense Systems
Automotive Industries
Elbit Systems
Israel Aerospace Industries
Israel Military Industries
Israel Shipyards
Israel Weapon Industries
Rafael Advanced Defense Systems

See also
IDF military operations

References

 
 
 
 
 
 Country Briefing: Israel, Jane's Defence Weekly, 19 June 1996

External links
Israel Defense Forces

Structure of contemporary armed forces